Freedom Sound is the debut album by The Jazz Crusaders recorded in 1961 and released on the Pacific Jazz label.

Reception

AllMusic rated the album with 4 stars; in his review, Scott Yanow said the band: "strikes a balance between creative hard bop and accessible soul-jazz".

Track listing 
 "The Geek" (Wilton Felder) – 5:50
 "M.J.S. Funk" (Wayne Henderson) – 5:55
 "That's It" (Felder) – 4:42
 "Freedom Sound" (Joe Sample) – 8:24
 "Theme from Exodus" (Ernest Gold) – 3:50
 "Coon" (Henderson) – 4:20
 "M.J.S.Funk" (Alt. Version) – 8:15
 "Coon" (Alt. Version) – 5:48

Personnel 
The Jazz Crusaders
Wayne Henderson – trombone
Wilton Felder – tenor saxophone
Joe Sample – piano
Roy Gaines – guitar (tracks 1 & 4) 
Jimmy Bond – bass
Stix Hooper – drums

References 

The Jazz Crusaders albums
1961 debut albums
Pacific Jazz Records albums